AVA Productions is an Indian film production company based in Chennai. The company was established in 2007 by A. V. Anoop, who is presently the Managing Director of the AVA Group. The company predominantly produces Malayalam films.

Films

References

External links
 

Film production companies based in Chennai
Indian companies established in 2007
2007 establishments in Tamil Nadu
Mass media companies established in 2007